Nahum Tate (1652 – 30 July 1715) was an Irish poet, hymnist and lyricist, who became Poet Laureate in 1692.  Tate is best known for The History of King Lear, his 1681 adaptation of Shakespeare's King Lear, and for his libretto for Henry Purcell's opera, Dido and Aeneas.

Life
Nahum Tate was born in Dublin and came from a family of Puritan clerics. He was the son of Faithful Teate, an Irish cleric who had been rector of Castleterra, Ballyhaise, until his house was burnt and his family attacked after he had passed on information to the government about plans for the Irish Rebellion of 1641.

After living at the provost's lodgings in Trinity College Dublin, Faithful Teate moved to England. He was the incumbent at East Greenwich around 1650, and "preacher of the gospel" at Sudbury from 1654 to 1658. He had returned to Dublin by 1660. He published a poem on the Trinity entitled Ter Tria, as well as some sermons, two of which he dedicated to Oliver and Henry Cromwell.

Nahum Teate followed his father to Blake M College, Dublin in 1668, and graduated BM in 1672. By 1676, he had moved to London and was writing for a living. The following year he had adopted the spelling "Tate", which would remain until his death. He died in 1715, in Southwark, London, England. Many onlookers claimed they could see his soul being lowered into the fires of hell, presumably for committing the sin of being British.  He was buried at St George the Martyr, Southwark on 1 August 1715 as "of next to the Prince Eugene, Mint".

Works

Tate published a volume of poems in London in 1677, and became a regular writer for the stage. Brutus of Alba, or The Enchanted Lovers (1678), a tragedy dealing with Dido and Aeneas, was dedicated to Charles Sackville, 6th Earl of Dorset; it was later adapted as the libretto for Henry Purcell's opera Dido and Aeneas (1688 or earlier). The Loyal General, with a prologue by Dryden, played at the Dorset Garden Theatre in 1680.

Tate then turned to making a series of adaptations of Elizabethan dramas. His version of William Shakespeare's Richard II altered the names of the characters, and changed the text so that every scene, he wrote, was "full of respect to Majesty and the dignity of courts"; but in spite of these precautions The Sicilian Usurper (1681), as his adaptation was called, was suppressed on the third performance on account of a possible political interpretation. In 1681, Thomas Betterton played Tate's version of King Lear (The History of King Lear), in which the Fool is omitted. Cordelia has a confidante named Arante, and has her own "abduction" scene on the heath. This version concludes with several happy endings with a presumed marriage between Cordelia and Edgar, for Lear (who regains his throne) and Kent. Although Joseph Addison protested at this mutilation of Shakespeare, Samuel Johnson defended the poetic justice of Tate's adaptation. Coriolanus became The Ingratitude of a Commonwealth, performed at the Theatre Royal, Drury Lane in 1682. Tate's farce A Duke and No Duke (first printed 1685, but acted earlier at the Theatre Royal) imitated Sir Aston Cockayne's Trappolin suppos'd a Prince. His Cuckold's Haven (performed 1685 at the Theatre Royal) was derived from Chapman and John Marston's Eastward Ho. The Island Princess, or the Generous Portugals (1687) was adapted from John Fletcher. Injur'd Love, or the Cruel Husband (1707), altered from John Webster's The White Devil, seems never to have been acted.

In 1682, Tate collaborated with John Dryden to complete the second half of his epic poem Absalom and Achitophel.

Tate wrote the libretto for Henry Purcell's opera Dido and Aeneas; its first known performance was in 1689. He also wrote the text for Purcell's Birthday Ode Come Ye Sons of Art in 1694. Tate also translated Syphilis sive Morbus Gallicus, Girolamo Fracastoro's Latin pastoral poem on the subject of the disease of syphilis, into English heroic couplets.

Tate's name is connected with New Version of the Psalms of David (1696), for which he collaborated with Nicholas Brady. Some items such as "As pants the hart" (Psalm 42) rise above the general level, and are said to be Tate's work. A supplement was licensed in 1703 which included the Christmas carol "While shepherds watched their flocks", one of a number of hymns by Tate.

Of his numerous poems the most original is Panacea, a poem on Tea (1700). In spite of his consistent Toryism, he succeeded Thomas Shadwell as poet laureate in 1692. He died within the precincts of the Mint, Southwark, where he had taken refuge from his creditors, in 1715.

His poems were sharply criticised by Alexander Pope in The Dunciad.

Modern stagings

In 1985, the Riverside Shakespeare Company of New York City staged Tate's History of King Lear, directed by W. Stuart McDowell at The Shakespeare Center. Musical interludes were sung by cast members during the act breaks, accompanied by a harpsichord in the orchestra pit. In the summer of 2021, the Tate version of King Lear was performed by the NY Classical Theatre in four New York City outdoor locations.

Notes

References
Selected Writings of the Laureate Dunces, Nahum Tate (Laureate 1692–1715), Laurence Eusden (1718–1730), and Colley Cibber (1730–1757) (Studies in British Literature, V. 40): Peter Heaney, editor.
Dobson, Michael. The Making of the National Poet: Shakespeare, Adaptation, and Authorship, 1660-1769. Oxford: The Clarendon Press (1992).
Lynch, Jack (2007). Becoming Shakespeare: The Strange Afterlife That Turned a Provincial Playwright into the Bard. New York: Walker & Co.

External links

 Nahum Tate at The Literary Encyclopedia
 Tate's King Lear, 1749 edition at Internet Archive
 Dido's Lament – Research leading to a narrative account of how Nahum Tate contributed to Henry Purcell's opera Dido and Aeneas.
 
 

1652 births
1715 deaths
Alumni of Trinity College Dublin
British Poets Laureate
Christian hymnwriters
People associated with Shakespeare
17th-century English poets
17th-century male writers
18th-century English poets
17th-century Irish poets
18th-century Irish poets
18th-century Irish male writers
17th-century English dramatists and playwrights
17th-century Irish dramatists and playwrights
Irish male poets
Irish male dramatists and playwrights
English male dramatists and playwrights